Hunterville is an unincorporated community in Stoddard County, in the U.S. state of Missouri.

History
A post office called Hunterville was established in 1903, and remained in operation until 1932. The community has the name of Stephen B. Hunter, original owner of the town site. A variant name was "Huntersville".

References

Unincorporated communities in Stoddard County, Missouri
Unincorporated communities in Missouri
1903 establishments in Missouri